Petrosino is a town in Sicily, Italy.

Petrosino may also refer to:

 Lieutenant Joseph Petrosino Park, Bensonhurst, Brooklyn, New York City
 Petrosino Square, a park in lower Manhattan in New York City, named for Joseph Petrosino

People with the surname
 Joseph Petrosino (1860–1909), New York City police officer and organized crime investigator
 Kiki Petrosino (born 1979), American poet and professor
 Natty Hollmann (aka Natty Petrosino; 1936–2021), Argentinian philanthropist, humanitarian, actor, and model
 Steven Petrosino (born 1951), American competitive drinker; see Drinking culture#Speed drinking

See also
 Maria Perosino (1961–2014), Italian author and art historian
 Petrosina, a suborder of marine haplosclerid sponges